Hôtel du Paradis is a 1986 French drama film directed by Jana Boková. It was screened out of competition at the 1987 Cannes Film Festival.

Cast
 Fernando Rey – Joseph
 Fabrice Luchini – Arthur
  – Frédérique
 Georges Géret – Dr. Jacob
 Hugues Quester – Maurice
 Marika Rivera – Marika
  – Sarah
 Raúl Gimenez – Emilio
 Juliet Berto – Prostitute
 Sacha Briquet – Georges
 Lou Castel – Tramp
 Michael Medwin – English producer
 Sheila Kotkin – Sheila
 Aurelle Doazan – Dream Girl
 Max Berto – Max
 Pascal Aubier – Head Waiter
 Alex Joffé
 Artus de Penguern – Patric
  – Lucienne Bayer
 Gilberte Géniat – Caretaker
 
  – Barbara
 Remi Deroche – Harry
 Catherine Mathely – Marianne
 Irene Langer – Irene
 Gérard Courant

References

External links

1986 films
1980s French-language films
1986 drama films
French drama films
1980s French films